Mario Méndez may refer to:

Mario Méndez (Mexican footballer) (born 1979), Mexican football player
Mario Méndez (Panamanian footballer) (born 1977), Panamanian football defender and manager
Mario Méndez (Uruguayan footballer) (born 1938), Uruguayan footballer
Mario Mendez (politician) (born 1989), American politician in the Rhode Island House of Representatives